Deandre Lamar Coleman (born January 27, 1991) is a former American football defensive tackle. He played college football at California. He was signed as an undrafted free agent by the Jacksonville Jaguars following the 2014 NFL Draft.

Early years
Coleman attended Garfield High School. He made the roster of the high school varsity football team in his freshman year.  He was selected to the Parade Magazine All-America team and was selected to the first-team all-state. He recorded 45 tackles and two forced fumbles in his Junior season in high school. In his Senior season, he recorded 46 tackles, two sacks, and a fumble recovery.

College career
Coleman was selected to the second-team preseason All-Pac-12 prior to his senior season. On June 19, 2013, he was selected to the Athlon's Preseason All-Pac-12 team prior his senior season. On July 11, 2013, he was named to the College Sports Madness All-Pac-12 preseason team. On July 11, 2013, he was named on the Outland Trophy Watch List. On December 20, 2013, he also was selected to Phil Steele's All-Pac-12 team following his senior season.

Professional career

Jacksonville Jaguars
Following the 2014 NFL Draft, Coleman was signed by the Jacksonville Jaguars as an undrafted free agent. The Jaguars released Coleman on August 29, 2014. He was signed to the practice squad on August 30, 2014.

Miami Dolphins
On September 23, 2014, the Miami Dolphins signed Coleman off the Jacksonville Jaguars' practice squad. On September 5, 2015, he was waived by the Dolphins. On the following day, Coleman was signed to the Dolphins' practice squad. On September 15, 2015, he was released by the Dolphins.

Denver Broncos
On September 22, 2015, the Denver Broncos signed Coleman to their practice squad. On October 3, 2015, he was released by the Broncos.

Miami Dolphins (second stint)
On November 18, 2015, Coleman was signed to the Dolphins' practice squad. On November 25, 2015, he was released from practice squad. On December 1, 2015, he was re-signed to the practice squad. On December 14, 2015, he was promoted to the active roster. On September 3, 2016, he was released by the Dolphins as part of final roster cuts.

Buffalo Bills
On September 7, 2016, Coleman was signed to the Bills' practice squad. He was promoted to the active roster on November 29, 2016.

On September 5, 2017, Coleman was released by the Bills, but was re-signed on September 20. He was released again on September 26, 2017. He was re-signed again on November 14, 2017. He was waived on December 26, 2017.

References

External links
Jacksonville Jaguars bio
California Golden Bears bio

Living people
1991 births
Players of American football from Seattle
American football defensive tackles
California Golden Bears football players
Jacksonville Jaguars players
Miami Dolphins players
Denver Broncos players
Buffalo Bills players